Collection is the title of the first compilation album released by the American country music artist Wynonna Judd. The standard version of the album reprised 11 tracks from her first three studio albums: her 1992 self-titled debut, 1993's Tell Me Why, and 1996's Revelations. The standard edition of the album contained no new tracks, but a number of the songs were presented in remixed versions.

The Australian edition of the album was a more comprehensive collection and included an additional six tracks. This edition added the international singles "Making My Way (Any Way That I Can," "Father Sun," and Wynonna's duet with Michael English "Healing." It also included her cover of the Lynyrd Skynyrd's "Free Bird."

Track listing

 "Heaven Help My Heart" (Tina Arena, Dean McTaggart, David Tyson) – 6:08
 "I Saw the Light" (Andrew Gold, Lisa Angelle) – 3:55
 "She Is His Only Need" (Dave Loggins) – 4:27
 "Only Love" (Marcus Hummon, Roger Murrah) – 3:35
 "No One Else on Earth" (Club Mix) (Jill Colucci, Stewart Harris, Sam Lorber) – 4:15
 "Is It Over Yet" (Single Version) (Billy Kirsch) – 3:50
 "Tell Me Why" (Karla Bonoff) – 3:50
 "My Strongest Weakness" (Naomi Judd, Mike Reid) – 4:22
 "To Be Loved by You" (Gary Burr, Reid) – 4:52
 "Rock Bottom" (Single Version) (Buddy Buie, J.R. Cobb) – 3:07
 "Girls with Guitars" (Mary Chapin Carpenter) – 3:17

 "No One Else on Earth" (Club Mix) (Jill Colucci, Stewart Harris, Sam Lorber) – 4:15
 "Making My Way (Any Way That I Can)"
 "Somebody To Love You"
 "Change The World"
 "Heaven Help My Heart" (Tina Arena, Dean McTaggart, David Tyson) – 6:08
 "Healing" (Duet with Michael English)
 "Rock Bottom" (Single Version) (Buddy Buie, J.R. Cobb) – 3:07
 "To Be Loved by You" (Gary Burr, Reid) – 4:52
 "Father Sun"
 "Free Bird"
 "Let's Make A Baby King"
 "Girls with Guitars" (Mary Chapin Carpenter) – 3:17
 "Only Love" (Marcus Hummon, Roger Murrah) – 3:35
 "I Saw the Light" (Andrew Gold, Lisa Angelle) – 3:55
 "She Is His Only Need" (Dave Loggins) – 4:27
 "My Strongest Weakness" (Naomi Judd, Mike Reid) – 4:22
 "Is It Over Yet" (Single Version) (Billy Kirsch) – 3:50
 "Tell Me Why" (Karla Bonoff) – 3:50

Charts

References

1997 compilation albums
Wynonna Judd albums
Albums produced by Tony Brown (record producer)
Curb Records compilation albums
MCA Records compilation albums